The Romulus b-rep solid modeler (or simply Romulus) was released in 1978 by Ian Braid, Charles Lang, Alan Grayer, and the Shape Data team in Cambridge, England. It was the first commercial solid modeling kernel designed for straightforward integration into CAD software. Romulus incorporated the CAM-I AIS (Computer Aided Manufacturers International's Application Interface Specification) and was the only solid modeler (other than its successors Parasolid and ACIS) ever to offer a third-party standard API to facilitate high-level integration into a host CAD software program. Romulus was quickly licensed by Siemens, HP and several other CAD software vendors.

See also 
 Comparison of computer-aided design editors
Shape Data Limited

References 

3D graphics software